Chlosyne whitneyi damoetas, the rockslide checkerspot, is a butterfly of the family Nymphalidae that is found in North America, from British Columbia and Alberta to Wyoming and Colorado.

Life cycle
The caterpillar of this species feeds on Erigeron leiomerus and Solidago multiradiata.

References

Butterflies of North America
whitneyi damoetas
Butterflies described in 1902